The Lumbovka is a river in the north of the Kola Peninsula in Murmansk Oblast, Russia. The Lumbovka flows into the Lumbovsky Gulf of the White Sea.

References

Rivers of Murmansk Oblast
Drainage basins of the White Sea